Mirlind Daku (born 1 January 1998) is a Kosovan professional footballer who plays as a forward for Slovenian club Mura, on loan from Croatian club Osijek, and the Kosovo national team.

Club career

Llapi
On 24 January 2017, Daku signed a five-year contract with Football Superleague of Kosovo club Llapi. On 18 February 2017, he made his debut with Llapi in the 2016–17 Kosovar Cup fifth round against Feronikeli after coming on as a 95th-minute substitute in place of Berat Hyseni and scoring his side's second goal during a 4–2 away win after penalties.

Osijek

First season at second team
On 20 July 2018, Daku joined Croatian Second League side Osijek II, on a four-year contract. On 25 August 2018, he made his debut in a 2–2 away draw against Šibenik after being named in the starting line-up. Eight days later, he scored his first goal for Osijek II in his second appearance for the club in a 1–0 home win over Sesvete in Croatian Second League.

Loan at Kukësi
On 24 July 2019, Daku joined Kategoria Superiore side Kukësi, on a season-long loan. On 18 August 2019, he made his debut with Kukësi in the 2019 Albanian Supercup against Partizani Tirana after coming on as a 66th-minute substitute in place of Vasil Shkurtaj. A month later, Daku scored his first goal for Kukësi in his sixth appearance for the club in a 3–1 away win over Shkumbini in Albanian Cup.

Loan at Ballkani
On 11 January 2020, Daku was loaned out to Football Superleague of Kosovo club Ballkani until the end of the 2019–20 season. On 29 February 2020, he made his debut in a 0–0 away draw against Prishtina after coming on as a 59th-minute substitute in place of Artur Magani.

Return from loan as first team player
On 24 June 2021, Daku returned to Croatian First League side Osijek. On 8 August 2021, he made his debut in a 2–1 away win against Hrvatski Dragovoljac after coming on as a 78th-minute substitute in place of Antonio Mance. A day after debut, he signed a four-year contract extension with Osijek. Three days later, Daku made his continental debut in the 2021–22 UEFA Europa Conference League third qualifying round against Bulgarian side CSKA Sofia after coming on as a second-half substitute in place of Yevhen Cheberko. On 15 September 2021, he scored his first goal for Osijek in his fifth appearance for the club in a 3–0 away win over Bednja Beletinec in Croatian Cup.

Loan at Mura
On 7 February 2022, Daku was loaned out to Slovenian PrvaLiga club Mura until the end of the 2021–22 season. Six days later, he made his debut against Bravo after being named in the starting line-up, and assisted his side's two goals during a 2–2 home draw.

After scoring 5 goals in 16 league appearances, his loan was extended for another season in June 2022.

International career

Under-21
On 21 March 2017, Daku received a call-up from Kosovo U21 for a 2019 UEFA European Under-21 Championship qualification match against the Republic of Ireland. His debut came on 9 November in a 2019 UEFA European Under-21 Championship qualification match against Israel after coming on as a 54th-minute substitute in place of Ardit Gashi.

Senior
On 22 January 2018, Daku received his first call-up from Kosovo for a friendly match against Azerbaijan. The match however was cancelled two days later, which has prolonged his debut. His debut with Kosovo came on 11 November 2020 in a friendly match against Albania after coming on as an 84th-minute substitute in place of Florent Hadergjonaj.

References

External links

1998 births
Living people
People from Gjilan
Association football forwards
Kosovan footballers
Kosovo under-21 international footballers
Kosovo international footballers
Kosovan expatriate footballers
Expatriate footballers in Croatia
Kosovan expatriate sportspeople in Croatia
Expatriate footballers in Albania
Kosovan expatriate sportspeople in Albania
Expatriate footballers in Slovenia
Kosovan expatriate sportspeople in Slovenia
KF Hajvalia players
KF Llapi players
FK Kukësi players
KF Ballkani players
NK Osijek players
NŠ Mura players
Football Superleague of Kosovo players
First Football League (Croatia) players
Kategoria Superiore players
Croatian Football League players
Slovenian PrvaLiga players